Cynipimorpha is a genus of flies in the family Stratiomyidae.

Distribution
Mexico.

Species
Cynipimorpha bilimecki Brauer, 1882

References

Stratiomyidae
Brachycera genera
Taxa named by Friedrich Moritz Brauer
Diptera of North America
Endemic insects of Mexico